D. Elmer Hawbaker (November 30, 1916 – November 26, 1994) was a member of the Pennsylvania State Senate, serving from 1961 to 1972.

References

Republican Party Pennsylvania state senators
1916 births
1994 deaths
People from Mercersburg, Pennsylvania
20th-century American politicians